Royce Deppe (born 11 August 1965, in Durban, South Africa) is a former professional tennis player from South Africa.  He enjoyed most of his tennis success while playing doubles.  During his career he won 1 doubles title.  He achieved a career-high doubles ranking of world No. 75 in 1992.

Career finals

Doubles (1 title, 2 runner-ups)

References

External links
 
 

South African male tennis players
1965 births
Living people
Sportspeople from Durban